Nadwi is title held by Islamic scholars who attended Darul Uloom Nadwatul Ulama. It may refer to one of the following:

Abul Hasan Ali Hasani Nadwi, Indian Islamic scholar and author
Abdul Bari Nadvi, Firangi Mahal Indian Islamic scholar
Abdullah Abbas Nadwi, Indian Islamic scholar
Bahauddeen Muhammed Jamaluddeen Nadwi, Indian Islamic scholar and Vice Chancellor of Darul Huda Islamic University
Ijteba Nadwi, Indian Muslim scholar
Mohammad Akram Nadwi, Indian Islamic scholar 
Rabey Hasani Nadwi, Indian scholar
Salman Nadwi, Indian scholar and professor in the Islamic sciences
Shihabuddin Nadvi, Indian Islamic philosopher, religious reformer and writer
Sulaiman Nadvi, Pakistani historian, writer and scholar of Islam
Syed Ehtisham Ahmed Nadvi, Indian scholar of Arabic language and Islamic studies
Abdul Hafeed Nadwi,
Freelance journalist,translator and a teacher

See also 
 Nadvi, alternative transcription

Arabic-language surnames
Islamic scholars
Indian surnames
Urdu-language surnames
Toponymic surnames
People from Lucknow
Nisbas